The economy of American Samoa is a traditional Polynesian economy in which more than 90% of the land is communally owned. Economic activity is strongly linked to the United States, with which American Samoa conducts the great bulk of its foreign trade. Tuna fishing and processing plants are the backbone of the private sector, with canned tuna being the primary export. Transfers from the U.S. federal government add substantially to American Samoa's economic well-being. Attempts by the government to develop a larger and broader economy are restrained by Samoa's remote location, its limited transportation, and its devastating hurricanes.

Statistics

GDP: purchasing power parity – $537 million (2007 est.)
country comparison to the world: 210

GDP (official exchange rate): $462.2 million (2005)

GDP – real growth rate: 3% (2003)
country comparison to the world: 139

GDP – per capita: purchasing power parity – $7,874 (2008)
country comparison to the world: 120

GDP – composition by sector:
agriculture:
NA%
industry:
NA%
services:
NA% (2002)

Labor Force: 17,630 (2005)
country comparison to the world: 203

Labor force – by occupation: government 33%, tuna canneries 34%, other 33% (1990)

Unemployment rate: 23.8% (2010)
country comparison to the world: 175

Population below poverty line:
NA% (2002 est.)

Household income or consumption by percentage share:
lowest 10%:
NA%
highest 10%:
NA%

Inflation rate (consumer prices):
NA% (2003 est.)

Budget:
revenues: $155.4 million (37% in local revenue and 63% in US grants)
expenditures: $183.6 million (FY07)

Agriculture – products: bananas, coconuts, vegetables, taro, breadfruit, yams, copra, pineapples, papayas; dairy products, livestock

Industries: tuna canneries (largely dependent on foreign fishing vessels), handicrafts

Industrial production growth rate: NA%

Electricity – production: 180 GWh (2006)
country comparison to the world: 179

Electricity – production by source:
fossil fuel:
100%
hydro:
0%
nuclear:
0%
other:
0% (2001)

Electricity – consumption: 167.4 GWh (2006)
country comparison to the world: 179

Electricity – exports: 0 kWh (2007)

Electricity – imports: 0 kWh (2007)

Oil – production:  (2007 est.)
country comparison to the world: 209

Oil – consumption:  (604 m³/d), 2006
country comparison to the world: 170

Oil – exports:  (2005)
country comparison to the world: 142

Oil – imports:  (2005)
country comparison to the world: 166

Natural gas – production: 0 cu m (2007)
country comparison to the world: 208

Natural gas – consumption: 0 cu m (2007)
country comparison to the world: 207

Natural gas – exports: 0 cu m (2007)
country comparison to the world: 202

Natural gas – imports: 0 cu m (2007)
country comparison to the world: 201

Natural gas – proved reserves: 0 cu m (2006)
country comparison to the world: 205

Exports: $445.6 million (2004)
country comparison to the world: 167

Exports – commodities:
canned tuna 93% (2004)

Exports – partners:
Indonesia 70%, Australia 6.7%, Japan 6.7%, Samoa 6.7% (2002)

Imports: $308.8 million (2004)
country comparison to the world: 195

Imports – commodities:
materials for canneries 56%, food 8%, petroleum products 7%, machinery and parts 6% (2004)

Imports – partners:
Australia 36.6%, New Zealand 20.3%, South Korea 16.3%, Mauritius 4.9% (2002)

Debt – external:
$NA (2002 est.)

Economic aid – recipient:
$NA; note – important financial support from the US, more than $40 million in 1994

Currency:
US dollar (USD)

Currency code:
USD

Exchange rates:
US dollar is used

Fiscal year:
1 October – 30 September

References

External links
 http://www.classbrain.com/art_cr/publish/american_samoa_economy.shtml